Kilian Edwin Virviescas Rojas (born 2 August 1980) is a Colombian former professional footballer who played as a left midfielder or full back, most notable for América de Cali, and Unión San Felipe.

Virviescas played three games with Colombia at the 2003 CONCACAF Gold Cup.

External links
 

1980 births
Living people
Footballers from Bogotá
Colombian footballers
América de Cali footballers
Real Cartagena footballers
Club Atlético River Plate footballers
San Lorenzo de Almagro footballers
Associação Desportiva São Caetano players
Deportes La Serena footballers
Club de Gimnasia y Esgrima La Plata footballers
Club Alianza Lima footballers
Independiente Santa Fe footballers
Deportes Tolima footballers
Envigado F.C. players
Unión San Felipe footballers
Chilean Primera División players
Argentine Primera División players
Colombian expatriate footballers
Colombian expatriate sportspeople in Chile
Colombian expatriate sportspeople in Argentina
Expatriate footballers in Chile
Expatriate footballers in Argentina
Expatriate footballers in Brazil
Expatriate footballers in Peru
Association football midfielders